Poropterus solidus is a species of the family Curculionidae.

Description
The basic colour is black or brown. The elytra and the pronotum are covered by tubercles.

Distribution
This species can be found in New Guinea (Moroka, Paumomu River).

References 

 Universal Biological Indexer
 Global Species
 Bishop Museum

Molytinae
Beetles described in 1898